The Dallas–Fort Worth Spurs were an American minor league baseball team in the Texas League from 1965–1971. The team played in Turnpike Stadium in Arlington, Texas.

The Spurs were created when the Triple-A Dallas Rangers moved to Vancouver, British Columbia, in 1965. With the opening of Turnpike Stadium, the Double-A Texas League's Fort Worth Cats, an affiliate of the Chicago Cubs, moved into the new venue and adopted the regional Dallas-Fort Worth designation and the Spurs nickname.

The Spurs were affiliated with the Cubs (1965–1967), Houston Astros (1968) and Baltimore Orioles (1969–1971). 

As a Cubs' affiliate, the Spurs groomed future Major League players Don Kessinger, Chuck Hartenstein, Joe Niekro, Fred Norman and Bill Stoneman. The club's one season in the Houston organization was lean in terms of prospects, with Fred Stanley and Danny Walton enjoying the longest big-league careers. During their affiliation with Baltimore, the Spurs featured Don Baylor, Bobby Grich, Enos Cabell and Wayne Garland, along with managers Cal Ripken Sr. and Joe Altobelli and batboy Cal Ripken Jr.

The Spurs set many Texas League attendance records, especially after Turnpike Stadium expanded to a capacity of 20,500 in 1970. The Dallas-Fort Worth area was considered a prime location for an expansion team or a re-located franchise.  Indeed, Turnpike Stadium had been built specifically to attract a major-league team to the Metroplex.  That dream nearly came to fruition when the National League expanded in 1969. But the league instead expanded to Montreal, with the Expos.

Two years later, the struggling Washington Senators received American League permission to transfer to the area in 1972 as the Texas Rangers, who moved into Turnpike Stadium (expanded and renamed Arlington Stadium).

Yearly record

References

Baltimore Orioles minor league affiliates
Chicago Cubs minor league affiliates
Defunct baseball teams in Texas
Defunct Texas League teams
Houston Astros minor league affiliates
Sports in Arlington, Texas
20th century in Arlington, Texas
Baseball teams in the Dallas–Fort Worth metroplex
Baseball teams disestablished in 1971
Baseball teams established in 1965